In algebra, a noncommutative Jordan algebra is an algebra, usually over a field of characteristic not 2, such that the four operations of left and right multiplication by x and x2 all commute with each other. Examples include associative algebras and Jordan algebras.

See also

Malcev-admissible algebra
Lie-admissible algebra

References

 

 
Non-associative algebra